Joanne Horniman (born 1951) is an Australian author who has won several awards for her books for children, teenagers and young adults.  Her novels often set in country New South Wales, and often deal with such themes as the search for identity, family relationships, growing up in rural communities, and teenage parenthood.

Biography
Joanne Horniman grew up in Murwillumbah in country New South Wales, Australia.  She started writing at the age of about six, and has written stories on a regular basis since then.  Growing up, she had an avid interest in politics, regularly reading the works of Karl Marx.  She studied at university in Sydney, and has worked as an editor, a colleges and university teacher, and as an author.  She now lives in Lismore in northern New South Wales. 
Her novel Loving Athena (2001) won a Notable Book title in the Australian Children's Book Council Awards in 1998; and her novel Mahalia (2001) won an Honour Book title in the same awards in 2002.  After writing a number of books for teenagers and young adults, she wrote her first book for adults, A Charm of Powerful Trouble in 2002.

Novels
Sand Monkeys, 1992
The Serpentine Belt, 1994
Loving Athena, 1997
Mahalia, 2001
A Charm of Powerful Trouble, 2002
Secret Scribbled Notebooks, 2004
Little Wing, 2006
My Candlelight Novel, 2008
About a Girl, 2010

Novels for younger readers
Jasmine, 1995
Sunflower, 1999

Picture books
Billygoat Goes Wild, 1995
Furry-Back and the Lizard-Thing, 1996

References
Profile on Allen & Unwin website, accessed 26 December 2006
Profile of Joanne Horniman on Australian Broadcasting Corporation website, accessed 26 December 2006

Australian children's writers
1951 births
Living people
Australian women writers